Rebecca Jasontek (born February 26, 1975) is an American competitor in synchronized swimming. She is the youngest daughter of Michael and Virginia Jasontek.  Rebecca grew up in Loveland, Ohio and attended Mount Notre Dame High School. She has an older sister, Julie. Rebecca's mother is the head coach of the Cincinnati Synchrogator Team. Ginny Jasontek is a former synchronized swimming champion from New Jersey who started the Synchrogator team in September 1969 at the Gamble-Nippert YMCA.

Jasontek won an Olympic bronze medal at the 2004 Summer Olympics, in the team competition.

Education
Jasontek attended The Ohio State University from 1993–1997 and received a Bachelor of Arts, Communication.  She graduated cum laude.

Personal life
Rebecca married Joey Tomsic in August 2003 and they welcomed their son in April 2010.

References

External links
 
 

1975 births
Living people
American synchronized swimmers
Olympic bronze medalists for the United States in synchronized swimming
Synchronized swimmers at the 2004 Summer Olympics
Medalists at the 2004 Summer Olympics
World Aquatics Championships medalists in synchronised swimming
Synchronized swimmers at the 2003 World Aquatics Championships
Pan American Games medalists in synchronized swimming
Pan American Games silver medalists for the United States
Synchronized swimmers at the 1999 Pan American Games
Swimmers from Cincinnati
Medalists at the 1999 Pan American Games
21st-century American women